Dyckia platyphylla is a plant species in the genus Dyckia. It is endemic to the State of Bahia in eastern Brazil.

Cultivars

 Dyckia 'Cherry Coke'
 Dyckia 'Coronet'
 Dyckia 'James Gray'
 Dyckia 'James Green'
 Dyckia 'Picante'
 Dyckia 'Red Devil'
 Dyckia 'Southern Star'

References

External links

platyphylla
Garden plants of South America
Endemic flora of Brazil
Plants described in 1970